The Guadalix is a river of Spain located in the centre of the Iberian Peninsula, a right-bank tributary of the Jarama.

Featuring a total length of 42 km, it runs southeastwards through the Community of Madrid until discharging in the Jarama near the Santo Domingo housing development (Algete), next to the Jarama Circuit.

Regarding the etymology of the hidronym Guadalix; the prefix comes from the Arabic wadi ("river") while the suffix -alix has been identified either as an alleged Arab anthroponym or as possibly pre-Arab.

References 

Tributaries of the Jarama
Rivers of the Community of Madrid